Time of Trial is a young adult historical novel by Hester Burton, first published in 1963. Set in early nineteenth century England, it addresses the themes of social reform and freedom of speech in a time of war. Hester Burton received the 1963 Carnegie Medal for this novel.

Setting
The novel opens in 1801, when Great Britain is still at war with France. The long war has caused poverty and starvation among the lower classes in England, and the governing classes are anxious about social unrest. The book's two principal locations are Holly Lane, London, where the Pargeters have a bookshop, and Herringsby on the Suffolk coast, a seaside resort and fishing village.

Plot summary
The novel is a third person narrative, mainly centring on the thoughts and experiences of Margaret Pargeter. The Pargeters live on Holly Lane, near St Paul's Cathedral, where they have a bookshop. Robert Kerridge lodges with them while studying medicine. Though poor for gentlefolk, they have a comfortable life compared to many of their neighbours. The bookseller has somewhat radical views and stocks such controversial works as The Rights of Man, which Margaret often feels impelled to hide from customers. Her brother John, who does not share his father's principles, loathes the bookshop and hopes to join the army.

The crisis of the novel is precipitated by a neglected tenement's collapse, which kills all the families who lived there. Inspired by the tragedy, Mr. Pargeter writes and distributes a pamphlet called The New Jerusalem in which he describes his vision of an ideal society. The rich object to his plan to hand over all property to the parishes to be administered for the good of all. He is arrested and found guilty of libelling the landlords and preaching sedition. The poor, on the other hand, object to his plan to prevent children under 14 from working, which they see as likely to make poor families poorer. While he is awaiting trial, a mob attacks his shop and burns it to the ground.

Through the intercession of Robert's father and uncle, Mr. Pargeter's sentence is fairly moderate: six months in the model prison at Ipswich. Dr. Kerridge offers Margaret free lodging in the seaside resort of Herringsbury in Suffolk so that she will be able to visit her father. His hidden agenda is to separate Margaret and his son, as he believes she would be an unsuitable wife for an ambitious doctor. However, despite his family's disapproval, Robert marries Margaret as soon as he is financially independent.

Drama comes to Herringsby when a riding-officer (a customs official) is found murdered. A regiment descends on the village with the intention of routing the smugglers. One of the officers of the regiment is John Pargeter, who had left London after the arrest. He makes peace with his sister and father. Mr. Pargeter plans to open a new bookshop and start a school, now believing that only through literacy and education can his dreams be realized.

Characters
Margaret Pargeter (sometimes called Meg), a 17-year-old girl, a book-lover
John Pargeter, her older brother, later an officer in the army
Mr. Pargeter, their elderly father, an idealistic bookseller
Mrs. Neech, the Pargeters' severe housekeeper
Elijah, a survivor of the tenement collapse, taken in by the Pargeters
Robert Kerridge, a medical student in love with Margaret
Dr. Kerridge, Robert's father, Mr. Pargeter's godson, an aristocratic physician
Mrs. Kerridge, Robert's mother
Sir Maurice Kerridge, Robert's uncle, a Member of Parliament
Mr. Stone, a bookdealer and friend of Mr. Pargeter
Mrs. Dunnett, a widow, Margaret's landlady in Herringsby
Lucy Moore, Margaret's friend in Herringsby
Mr. and Mrs. Moore, their son Dick and Aunt Kitty, Lucy's family, farmers
Dan Fiske, a fisherman and probably a smuggler

Reception and literary significance
For  Time of Trial Hester Burton won the annual Carnegie Medal recognising the year's best children's book by a British subject. It was the fourth historical novel to appear on the winning list. In her New York Times review of the novel, Mary Stolz wrote: "When Hester Burton... writes a historical novel, it is not a modern romance with appliqués of research but a sound portrait of the period, presented with unobtrusive scholarship."

Articles
Hester Burton:  "How I Came to Write Time of Trial"  The Junior Bookshelf volume 28 (July 1964) pp 135–38.

References

External links
Time of Trial at Fantastic Fiction
Time of Trial, 1st American edition, 1964 at WorldCat

1963 British novels
Children's historical novels
British young adult novels
Novels set in London
Novels set in Suffolk
Carnegie Medal in Literature winning works
Novels set in the 19th century
1963 children's books
Novels by Hester Burton
Oxford University Press books